Shabab Al-Aqaba Club is a Jordanian football club based in Aqaba, Jordan.

Stadium
Shabab Al-Aqaba plays their home games at Al-Aqaba Stadium in Aqaba. The stadium was built and opened on 2017. It has a current capacity of 3,800 spectators .

Kits
Shabab Al-Aqaba's home kit is all blue shirts and shorts, while their away kit is all white shirts and shorts.

Kit suppliers and shirt sponsors

Current squad

References

External links
فريق: العقبة
نادي شباب العقبة الرياضي
Jordan - Al Aqaba SC - Results, fixtures, tables, statistics - Futbol24
Jordan - Aqaba - Results, fixtures, squad, statistics, photos, videos and news - Soccerway

Shabab Al-Aqaba
Association football clubs established in 1965
1965 establishments in Jordan